Hart Lake is a lake in Swift County, in the U.S. state of Minnesota.

Hart Lake took the name of Isaac Hart, a pioneer settler.

See also
List of lakes in Minnesota

References

Lakes of Minnesota
Lakes of Swift County, Minnesota